Female sexual arousal disorder (FSAD) is a disorder characterized by a persistent or recurrent inability to attain sexual arousal or to maintain arousal until the completion of a sexual activity. The diagnosis can also refer to an inadequate lubrication-swelling response normally present during arousal and sexual activity. The condition should be distinguished from a general loss of interest in sexual activity and from other sexual dysfunctions, such as the orgasmic disorder (anorgasmia) and hypoactive sexual desire disorder, which is characterized as a lack or absence of sexual fantasies and desire for sexual activity for some period of time.

Although female sexual dysfunction is currently a contested diagnostic, it has become more common in recent years to use testosterone-based drugs off-label to treat FSAD.

Causes

A number of studies have explored the factors that contribute to female sexual arousal disorder and female orgasmic disorder. These factors include both psychological and physical factors. Psychologically, possible causes of the disorder include the impact of childhood and adolescence experiences and current events – both within the individual and within the current relationship.

Individual factors
There has been little investigation of the impact of individual factors on female sexual dysfunction. Such factors include stress, levels of fatigue, gender identity, health, and other individual attributes and experiences, such as dysfunctional sexual beliefs that may affect sexual desire or response. Over exposure to pornography-style media is also thought to lead to poor body image, self-consciousness and lowered self-esteem. An individual's sexual activity is disrupted by overwhelming emotional distress resulting in inability to attain sexual pleasure. Sexual dysfunction can also occur secondary to major psychiatric disorders, including depression.

Relationship factors
A substantial body of research has explored the role of interpersonal factors in female sexual dysfunction, particularly in relation to orgasmic response. These studies have largely focused on the impact of the quality of the relationship on the sexual functioning of the partners. Some studies have evaluated the role of specific relationship variables, whereas others have examined overall relationship satisfaction. Some studies have explored events, while others have focused on attitudes as an empirical measure of relationship functioning. Subject populations have varied from distressed couples to sexually dysfunctional clients to those in satisfied relationships.

Social context
In addition to past experience and personal psychology, social context plays a factor:
Human sexual behavior also varies with hormonal state, social context, and cultural conventions. Ovarian hormones influence female sexual desire, but the specific sexual behaviors engaged in are affected by perceived pregnancy risk, suggesting that cognition plays an important role in human sexual behavior.

Physical factors
Estimates of the percentage of female sexual dysfunction attributable to physical factors have ranged from 30% to 80%. The disorders most likely to result in sexual dysfunction are those that lead to problems in circulatory or neurological function. These factors have been more extensively explored in men than in women. Physical etiologies such as neurological and cardiovascular illnesses have been directly implicated in both premature and retarded ejaculation as well as in erectile disorder, but the contribution of physiological factors to female sexual dysfunction is not so clear. However, recent literature does suggest that there may be an impairment in the arousal phase among diabetic women. Given that diabetic women show a significant variability in their response to this medical disorder, it is not surprising that the disease's influence on arousal is also highly variable. In fact, the lack of a clear association between medical disorders and sexual functioning suggests that psychological factors play a significant part in the impact of these disorders on sexual functioning.

Kenneth Maravilla, Professor of Radiology and Neurological Surgery and Director of MRI Research Laboratory at the University of Washington, Seattle, presented research findings based on neuro-imaging of women's sexual function. In a small pilot study of four women with female sexual arousal disorder, Maravilla reported there was less brain activation seen in this group, including very little activation in the amygdala. These women also showed increased activation in the temporal areas, in contrast to women without sexual difficulties, who showed deactivation in similar areas. This may suggest an increased level of inhibition with an arousal stimulus in this small group of women with FSAD.

Several types of medications, including selective serotonin reuptake inhibitors (SSRIs), can cause sexual dysfunction and in the case of SSRI and SNRI, these dysfunctions may become permanent after the end of the treatment.

Interplay of causes
Kaplan proposed that sexual dysfunction was based on intrapsychic, interpersonal, and behavioural levels. Four factors were identified that could have a role in the development of sexual dysfunction: 1) lack of correct information regarding sexual and social interaction, 2) unconscious guilt or anxiety regarding sex, 3) performance anxiety, and 4) failure to communicate between the partners.

Diagnosis

DSM-5 
The DSM-5 lists the diagnostic criteria as including a minimum of three of the following:

 Little interest in sex
 Few thoughts related to sex
 Decreased start and rejecting of sex
 Little pleasure during sex most of the time
 Decreased interest in sex even when exposed to erotic stimuli
 Little genital sensations during sex most of the time

DSM-IV 
The DSM-IV (American Psychiatric Association 1994) diagnostic criteria were:

 persistent or recurrent inability to attain, or to maintain until completion of the sexual activity, an adequate lubrication-swelling response of sexual excitement,
 the disturbance causes marked distress or interpersonal difficulty, and
 the sexual dysfunction is not better accounted for by another Axis I disorder (except another sexual dysfunction) and is not due exclusively to the direct physiological effects of a substance (e.g., a drug of abuse, a medication) or a general medical condition.

Marita P. McCabe noted:

Subtypes
There are several subtypes of female sexual arousal disorders. They may indicate onset: lifelong (since birth) or acquired. They may be based on context: they may occur in all situations (generalized) or be situation-specific (situational). For example, the disorder may occur with a spouse but not with a different partner.

The length of time the disorder has existed and the extent to which it is partner- or situation-specific, as opposed to occurring in all situations, may be the result of different causative factors and may influence the treatment for the disorder. It may be due to psychological factors or a combination of factors.

Treatment
The FDA has approved flibanserin and bremelanotide for low sexual libido in women.

Criticism

One problem with the current definition in the DSM-IV  is that subjective arousal is not included. There is often no correlation between women's subjective and physiological arousal. With this in mind, recently, FSAD has been divided up into sub-types:
 Genital Arousal Disorder
 Subjective Sexual Arousal Disorder
 Combined Genital and Subjective Arousal Disorder
The third sub-type is the most common in clinical settings.

One criticism is that "the meaningful benefits of experimental drugs for women's sexual difficulties are questionable, and the financial conflicts of interest of experts who endorse the notion of a highly prevalent medical condition are extensive."

Professor of bioethics and sociology Jennifer R. Fishman argues that the categorization of female sexual dysfunction as a treatable disease has only been made possible through the input of academic clinical researchers. Through ethnographic research, she believes she has shown how academic clinical researchers have provided the scientific research needed by pharmaceutical companies to bio-medicalize female sexual dysfunction and consequently identify a market of consumers for it. She questions the professional ethics of this exchange network between researchers and pharmaceutical companies, as the clinical research trials are funded by pharmaceutical companies and researchers are given considerable financial rewards for their work. She argues that the conferences where definition of the disease and diagnostic criteria are defined and research is presented to clinicians are also ethically ambiguous, as they are also funded by pharmaceutical companies.

Heather Hartely of Portland State University, Oregon is critical of the shift from female sexual dysfunction being framed as an arousal problem to a desire problem. In her article, "The 'Pinking' of Viagra Culture", she states that the change from female sexual arousal disorder to hypoactive sexual desire disorder is indicative of "disease mongering" tactics by the drug industry through an effort to match up a drug to some subcomponent of the DSM classification.

Additionally, Leonore Tiefer of NYU School of Medicine voiced concerns that the success of Viagra, in combination with feminist rhetoric, were being used as a means of fast-tracking public acceptance of pharmaceutical treatment of female sexual arousal disorder. The justification behind this, she says, is that "the branding of Viagra has succeeded so thoroughly in rationalizing the idea of sexual correction and enhancement through pills that it seems inevitable and only fair that such a product be made available for women," giving a dangerous appeal to "nonapproved drugs though off-label prescribing".

References

External links 

 A brief review that explores issues of the medicalization of the female orgasm
 

Human female reproductive system
Sexual dysfunctions
Sexual health
Sexual arousal
Midwifery